Leander Paes and Nenad Zimonjić were the defending champions, but they did not participate together this year.  Paes partnered Martin Damm, losing in the second round.   Zimonjić partnered Max Mirnyi, losing in the second round.

Mark Knowles and Daniel Nestor won in the final 6–2, 6–7(4–7), [10–5], against Mariusz Fyrstenberg and Marcin Matkowski.

Seeds
All seeds receive a bye into the second round.

Draw

Finals

Top half

Bottom half

External links
Draw

Torneo Godo
2006 Torneo Godó